The Thuggee and Dacoity Department was an organ of the East India Company, and inherited by British India, which was established in 1830 with the mission of addressing dacoity (banditry), highway robbery, and particularly the Thuggee cult of robbers.

Among the Department's more recognised members was Colonel William Sleeman, who headed the outfit from 1835–39 and is known as the man who eliminated the Thuggee.

In 1874, Sir Edward Bradford, 1st Baronet was made General Superintendent of the Thuggee and Dacoit Department.

The department existed until 1904, when it was replaced by the Central Criminal Intelligence Department.

References

1830 establishments in British India
Government agencies established in 1830
Organizations disestablished in 1904
Indian intelligence agencies
History of law enforcement in India
1904 disestablishments in India
Government of British India